The following is a list of the MTV Europe Music Award winners and nominees for Best Australia Act.

Winners and nominees
Winners are listed first and highlighted in bold.

2010s

2020s

See also
 MTV VMA International Viewer's Choice Award for MTV Australia
 MTV Australia Awards

References

MTV Europe Music Awards
Australian music awards
Awards established in 2013